The 1983 Cotton Bowl Classic was the 47th edition of the college football bowl game, played at the Cotton Bowl in Dallas, Texas, on Saturday, January 1. Part of the 1982–83 bowl game season, it matched the fourth-ranked SMU Mustangs of the Southwest Conference (SWC) and the #6 Pittsburgh Panthers, an independent. A slight underdog, SMU rallied in the fourth quarter to win, 7–3.

The game featured SMU running back Eric Dickerson and Pittsburgh quarterback Dan Marino; both were first round picks in the 1983 NFL Draft and are members of the Pro Football Hall of Fame.

Despite the two teams combining for 622 yards, only ten points were scored in the game as there were four turnovers, and the final one decided the game.

Teams

Pittsburgh

The Panthers won their first seven games and attained the #1 ranking, but lost at home to Notre Dame, and later fell at rival Penn State, the eventual national champion. Through , this is their only appearance in the Cotton Bowl.

SMU

The Mustangs opened with ten wins, then tied Arkansas. This was SMU's fourth Cotton Bowl, their first in sixteen years, and remains the program's most recent major bowl appearance.

Game summary
Televised by CBS, the game kicked off shortly after 12:30 p.m. CST, as did the Fiesta Bowl on NBC. Temperatures in Dallas were around freezing, with light rain and sleet.

The Panthers drove to the SMU 1-yard line on the game's opening series, but Panther halfback Joe McCall fumbled, and Mustang safety Wes Hopkins fell on the loose ball at the 2-yard line. SMU and Pittsburgh did not score in the half, the first scoreless first half in the Cotton Bowl in 

On their first possession of the third quarter, the Panthers scored first when Eric Schubert booted a 43-yard field goal. SMU went on an 80-yard drive, capped by quarterback Lance McIlhenny's nine-yard touchdown run early in the fourth quarter, which was the only touchdown of the day.

Dan Marino then engineered a drive which put the Panthers in scoring position at the SMU 7-yard line. On third-and goal and under pressure, Marino threw a pass, but it was tipped by Hopkins and intercepted in the end zone by Blane Smith, helping to clinch the victory for SMU, who finished without a loss for the season.

Scoring
First quarter
No scoring
Second quarter
No scoring
Third quarter
Pittsburgh - Eric Schubert 43-yard field goal
Fourth quarter
SMU - Lance McIlhenny 9-yard run (Jeff Harrell kick)

Statistics
{| class=wikitable style="text-align:center"
! Statistics !! SMU !! Pittsburgh
|-
| First Downs || 22 || 17
|-
| Yards Rushing|| 60–153|| 29–104
|-
| Yards Passing || 101|| 181
|-
| Passing || 5–9–0 || 19–37–1
|-
| Total Offense || 69–254|| 66–285
|-
|Punts–Average ||4–38.0|| 3–44.7
|-
|Fumbles–Lost ||4–2|| 1–1
|-
|Turnovers ||2|| 2
|-
|Penalties–Yards ||2–30|| 8–74
|-
|Time of possession || 32:48 || 27:12
|}
Game leaders

Rushing: SMU - Dickerson 27-124; Pittsburgh - Thomas 19-69
Passing: SMU - McIlhenny 5-8-101; Pittsburgh - Marino 19-37-181
Receiving: SMU - James 3-39; Pittsburgh - McCall 5-58, Thomas 5-38

Aftermath
SMU climbed to second in the final AP poll and Pittsburgh fell to tenth.

References

1982–83 NCAA football bowl games
1983
1983
1983
January 1983 sports events in the United States
Cotton